Donna Mills (born Donna Jean Miller on December 11, 1940) is an American actress. She began her television career in 1966 with a recurring role on The Secret Storm, and in the same year appeared on Broadway in the Woody Allen comedy Don't Drink the Water. She made her film debut the following year in The Incident. She then starred for three years in the soap opera Love is a Many Splendored Thing (1967–70), before starring as Tobie Williams, the girlfriend of Clint Eastwood's character in the 1971 cult film Play Misty for Me.

Mills landed the role of Abby Cunningham on the primetime soap opera Knots Landing in 1980 and was a regular on the show until 1989. For this role, she won the Soap Opera Digest Award for Outstanding Villainess three times, in 1986, 1988, and 1989. She has since starred in several TV movies, including False Arrest (1991), In My Daughter's Name (1992), Dangerous Intentions (1995),  The Stepford Husbands (1996), and Ladies of the House (2008). In 2014, she joined the cast of long-running daytime soap opera General Hospital, for which she won a Daytime Emmy Award for Outstanding Special Guest Performer in a Drama Series. Mills also appeared in the films Joy (2015) and Nope (2022).

Early life
Mills was born Donna Jean Miller in Chicago, to Bernice (née Lantz), a dance teacher, and Frank, a market researcher. She has one older brother, Donald, and grew up in Norwood Park. Mills attended Garvy Elementary School and Taft High School; one of her classmates was Jim Jacobs, co-creator of Grease, who based the character of Sandy on her.

Mills attended the University of Illinois at Urbana-Champaign where she was a member of Delta Gamma sorority. She completed one year of course work, then left to pursue a dancing career, gaining some early stage experience when she danced in summer stock productions. Her first professional acting role was in a production of Come Blow Your Horn at the Drury Lane Theater in Chicago. She later was cast in a touring production of My Fair Lady, which brought her to New York City.

Career

1960s—1970s
Mills began her acting career on television playing a nightclub singer named Rocket in two episodes on the Manhattan-based CBS daytime soap opera, The Secret Storm in 1966. She later appeared on Broadway in Woody Allen's comedy Don't Drink the Water as the Sultan of Bashir's wife. Following this, she made her big screen debut in the neo noir crime-thriller film, The Incident (1967), co-starring alongside Martin Sheen, Beau Bridges, Ed McMahon and Thelma Ritter. The film received positive reviews from critics and was successful in a box office. In the fall of 1967, Mills gained a regular role as ex-nun Laura Donnelly on the new CBS daytime soap opera, Love is a Many Splendored Thing. She left the series in 1970 and relocated to the West Coast, thereupon making her primetime TV debut in an episode of Western series, Lancer. 

In 1971, Mills starred alongside Clint Eastwood and Jessica Walter in the psychological thriller film Play Misty for Me directed by Eastwood for Universal Pictures. The film received positive reviews from critics and was financial success for the studio. During 1971–72, she starred in the short-lived sitcom The Good Life with Larry Hagman, who later guest-starred on Knots Landing as J. R. Ewing from the show's sister series Dallas. She signed a contract with Universal Studios in 1972 and spent much of the 1970s appearing as a guest on top-rated television shows such as Gunsmoke, The Six Million Dollar Man, Hawaii Five-O, The Love Boat, CHiPs, The F.B.I., Quincy, M.E., the UK's Thriller series, Police Woman, and Fantasy Island. 

Mills starred as a leading actress in a number of made-for-television movies trough 1970s. Her role in Play Misty for Me went her for typecast as a damsel in distress for next few years. She starred in Haunts of the Very Rich, Rolling Man and Night of Terror in 1972, was lead actress in The Bait (1973), Live Again, Die Again (1974), Beyond the Bermuda Triangle (1975), Curse of the Black Widow , The Hunted Lady, Woman on the Run and Bunco in 1977, Bunco (1978), and co-starred in Who Is the Black Dahlia? (1975), Look What's Happened to Rosemary's Baby (1976), Smash-Up on Interstate 5 (1976), Fire! (1977), Superdome (1978) and Hanging by a Thread (1979). She starred as the female lead in the American International Pictures heist comedy film Murph the Surf opposite Robert Conrad.

1980s: Knots Landing
In 1980, Mills landed her most prominent role — that of scheming, manipulative vixen Abby Cunningham on the long-running primetime soap opera Knots Landing. Mills portrayed Abby from 1980 to 1989. Prior to being cast in Knots Landing, Mills was primarily known for playing the "damsel in distress" archetype in both film and television media. The actress became somewhat famous for playing these roles, often leading to unwanted typecasting. In an interview with Jerry Buck for the Toledo Blade, Mills said: "I got tired of playing the victim. It's a more active role. Abby keeps things stirred up, and I like that." According to series creator David Jacobs, Abby was not planned when the show began. He knew that he wanted a female J.R. Ewing-esque character. However, he had a different sense of the character and who would wind up in the role. With Mills's reputation of playing the victim, he initially did not choose her for the part.

Josh Mapes of The Biography Channel listed her in the category "10 Primetime Stars We Love to Hate". He said, "Any great soap opera needs a great villain. While viewers may identify more with the protagonist, the villains in a serial drama always spice things up, cause trouble, and make it more fun to watch. From tongue lashings to catfights, underhanded tricks to boldface lies, the characters we love to hate have each brought a fair share of great moments to primetime soaps. While Larry Hagman played the bad guy on Dallas, Donna Mills played bad girl on its spin-off, Knots Landing. Unapologetically going after what she wanted, Mills's character engaged in affairs with two of the husbands on the Knots Landing cul-de-sac, but like most vixens on primetime soaps, she was only out for money, not love."

In 1989, Mills announced her intention to leave the long-running nighttime soap after nine years as Abby. According to Mills, she wanted to take a break from acting for a while, and from Abby, as well. In an interview with The Cedartown Standard, Mills explained: "I'm tired of the show. It's been too long. I'm not particularly happy with the way they've been writing Abby lately. She's too soft. I'd like Abby to get back to her old self." For this role, she won the Soap Opera Digest Award for Outstanding Villainess on three occasions, in 1986, 1988, and 1989.

During her time in Knots Landing, Mills also appeared in a number of other projects. In 1982, she starred alongside Genie Francis and Linda Evans in the CBS two-part miniseries Bare Essence, and in 1985 appeared in the CBS musical film Alice in Wonderland. She played the leading roles in the made-for-television movies He's Not Your Son (1984), Intimate Encounters (1986), Outback Bound (1988) and The Lady Forgets (1989).

1990s–present 
After Knots Landing, Mills concentrated on television movies, several of which she co-produced under her company Donna Mills Productions: The World's Oldest Living Bridesmaid (1990), Runaway Father (1991), In My Daughter's Name (1992), My Name Is Kate (1994) and An Element of Truth (1995). She returned to Knots Landing for its final episode in 1993, and again for the reunion miniseries Knots Landing: Back to the Cul-de-Sac in 1997. In between, she had a brief recurring guest role as the mother of Jane Mancini (played by Josie Bissett) on Melrose Place from 1996 to 1997. Her other 1990s credits including prison drama False Arrest (1991), The President's Child (1992) based on Fay Weldon's novel, Remember (1993) based on the novel by Barbara Taylor Bradford, domestic violence-drama Dangerous Intentions (1995), inspired by the Ira Levin novel The Stepford Wives thriller The Stepford Husbands (1996), and murder-mystery Moonlight Becomes You (1998) based on Mary Higgins Clark's novel. She also guest-starred in the television sitcoms The John Larroquette Show, Dream On, High Society and Rude Awakening.

After few years in semi-retirement, Mills continued to appear on television in movies and guest roles. In 2004, she starred as Mrs. Claus opposite George Hamilton in the Holiday comedy film A Very Cool Christmas. In 2005, she reunited with the Knots Landing cast for the nonfiction special, Knots Landing Reunion: Together Again, in which the stars reminisced about the show. In more recent years, Mills has appeared in various television movies such as Love Is A Four Letter Word in 2007 and Ladies of the House alongside Florence Henderson and Pam Grier in 2008, as well as guest appearances in series such as Cold Case (in a provocative role as a woman who seduces her grandson) and Nip/Tuck (guest-starring with fellow Knots Landing star Joan Van Ark). In 2012, she made a guest appearance on GCB as Bitsy Lourd and appeared as a guest judge on the reality series RuPaul's Drag U. The following year, she starred in the thriller film Deadly Revenge produced by MarVista Entertainment, and played psychologist in the independent comedy-drama When Life Keeps Getting In The Way.

In 2014, Mills made her return to daytime soap operas, for the first time since 1970. She was cast in a major recurring guest-starring role in the ABC soap opera General Hospital. She debuted in mid-March and stayed to May. Later  that same year, she returned for another multiple-episode arc. At the 42nd Daytime Emmy Awards, Mills won Outstanding Special Guest Performer in a Drama Series for her performance in General Hospital, in a three-way tie with Fred Willard and Ray Wise. In August 2018, Mills returned for another multiple-episode arc.

On October 7, 2014, it was announced that Mills will star in the POP reality series Queens of Drama about a group of former stars who now produce a new primetime serial drama to star in. The ladies will be required to work together in front of and behind the cameras as they develop, pitch, and produce their steamy series with the hopes of landing a pilot deal by the end of the season.

Mills had a role in David O. Russell's film Joy, which was released in December 2015. Also in 2015, she starred in the holiday comedy-drama, 12 Gifts of Christmas for Hallmark Channel.

In 2017, Mills was cast in the lead role of Daisy Werthan in the Colony Theatre's production of Alfred Uhry's Pulitzer Prize-winning play, Driving Miss Daisy. Also that year, she played a leading role in the Pure Flix streaming drama series, Hilton Head Island. In 2019, she starred alongside Dyan Cannon and Crystal Hunt in the Pure Flix comedy series Mood Swings. She also starred in the independent films Best Mom (2018), Turnover (2019), and A Beauty & the Beast Christmas (2019).

In 2022, Mills appeared in the Jordan Peele's horror film Nope and received Palm Springs International Film Festival Women In Film and Television's Above And Beyond Award. She also starred in the thriller film Abused alongside James Russo, Taryn Manning and Angie Stone. Later that year, she was cast in Dawn as wicked grandmother Lillian Cutler. In January 2023, she guest starred in the ABC crime series, The Rookie: Feds making her first prime-time television series appearance in ten years. In 2023, she was cast in the Ava DuVernay film Caste based upon Caste: The Origins of Our Discontents by Isabel Wilkerson.

Personal life
Never married, Mills had an on-again, off-again relationship with advertising executive Richard Holland (former husband of singer Chaka Khan) during the 1980s and 1990s. In September 1994, Mills adopted a newborn daughter, Chloe. She has been in a relationship with Larry Gilman since 2001, and says their decision not to combine finances by marrying is "much cleaner, much better."

Mills appeared in cover-featured (non-nude) pictorials for the October 1987 and November 1989 editions of Playboy.

Filmography

Awards and nominations

References

External links

 
 
 
 

20th-century American actresses
21st-century American actresses
Actresses from Chicago
Actresses from Los Angeles
American film actresses
American soap opera actresses
American stage actresses
American television actresses
Daytime Emmy Award for Outstanding Guest Performer in a Drama Series winners
Living people
University of Illinois Urbana-Champaign alumni
1940 births